Copine-8 is a protein that in humans is encoded by the CPNE8 gene.

Calcium-dependent membrane-binding proteins may regulate molecular events at the interface of the cell membrane and cytoplasm. This gene is one of several genes that encode a calcium-dependent protein containing two N-terminal type II C2 domains and an integrin A domain-like sequence in the C-terminus.

References

Further reading

External links